Lascoria antigone is a species of litter moth of the family Erebidae. It is found in Central and South America, including Suriname and Costa Rica.

External links
Records from Costa Rica

Herminiinae
Moths described in 1916